My Aquarium (Blue Oasis in Japan) is a virtual pet video game by Hudson Soft for WiiWare and PlayStation Network. It was released in Japan on June 24, 2008, in Europe on August 15, 2008 and in North America on September 1, 2008 for the WiiWare and on September 8, 2010 in Japan for the PlayStation Network.

Overview
The game is a virtual aquarium that sees players caring for fish in up to six aquariums of their own design. The player can choose from 49 species of fish (most of which must be unlocked as only 13 are available at the beginning) to populate an aquarium that can be customized with a choice of decorations, backgrounds, lighting and plant life.

The game also utilizes data from the Forecast Channel, changing lighting and conditions based on the weather. However, there is no emphasis on realism; for example salt water and fresh water fish can be placed together and water temperature is not taken into consideration. While no cheats are available for the game itself, it has been noted that the game runs off of the various aspects of the Wii system and with that in mind, the date from the system settings can be changed repeatedly to unlock new or hidden items.

Players can also send their own aquariums to other players with the game through WiiConnect24.

Sequel
A sequel entitled My Aquarium 2 was released in Japan on August 3, 2010, in North America on August 9, 2010 and in the PAL region on September 10, 2010 for the WiiWare.

Reception
IGN gave it a 6/10, likening it to a screensaver and calling time spent with it a "boot and watch" experience, ultimately leaving readers to decide if My Aquarium appeals to them.

References

External links
Japanese website
US website
My Aquarium at IGN

2008 video games
WiiWare games
PlayStation 3 games
PlayStation Network games
Video games developed in Japan
Virtual pet video games
Wii games
Video games with underwater settings